The discography of Japanese musical act Superfly consists of six studio albums, four compilation albums, three extended plays, five video albums and thirty-two singles. Superfly began as a duo in 2003 by vocalist Shiho Ochi and guitarist Koichi Tabo; signing with Warner Music Japan in 2007. Tabo left the band in 2007 just before the release of their single "I Spy I Spy", finding it difficult to work as both the act's songwriter and guitarist. However, Tabo remained attached to Superfly, composing and producing songs for the unit until Superfly's single "Ai o Karada ni Fukikonde" (2014) and Superfly's fifth studio album White (2015), where Ochi collaborated with a range of songwriters instead.

In 2008, Superfly were chosen to sing "Ai o Komete Hanataba o", the theme song for the TV drama, Edison no Haha, starring Misaki Ito. The song was certified Million for digital downloads by the RIAJ. The band's debut album Superfly (2008) was released three months later and debuted at the top of the Japanese Oricon albums chart. Six of their releases between 2008 and 2013 reached number one on Oricon's albums chart. Other than "Ai o Komete Hanataba o", the act's most commercially successful songs include "Alright!!" (2009), the opening theme song for the drama Boss, and "Tamashii Revolution" (2010), a song used by NHK during the 2010 FIFA World Cup and other soccer broadcasts. Both of these songs have been certified Double Platinum by the RIAJ. Superfly achieved one number-one single on the Billboard Japan Hot 100, the theme song for Fuji Television drama Gold, "Wildflower" (2010). As the single was packaged together with an additional compilation album of Western covers, Cover Songs: Complete Best 'Track 3', it was ineligible to chart on the Japanese Oricon singles chart, achieving number one on the Oricon weekly albums chart instead.

Albums

Studio albums

Compilation albums

Extended plays

Singles

Promotional singles

Other charted songs

Other appearances

Videography

Video albums

Music videos

Notes

References

Discographies of Japanese artists
Rock music group discographies
Pop music group discographies